Zingler is a surname. Notable people with the surname include:

 (1922–1984), Austrian politician
Thomas Zingler (born 1970), Austrian footballer

See also
Ziegler
Zinger (disambiguation)

German-language surnames